Warcop is a village and civil parish in the Eden district of Cumbria, England. The parish had a population of 491 in the 2001 census, increasing to 532 at the Census 2011.

Name
The name Warcop means 'hill with a cairn', and was spelt Warthecopp and otherwise in the 13th century and earlier. It is a compound word that combines viking age Old Norse varða (cairn, a pile of stones) and the Old English copp (a summit or hill top). The lords of the manor of Warthecopp / Warcop over time changed their surname from Warthecopp to Warcop.

History
The local Church of England parish is St Columba's Church, Warcop, which is a Norman church and is built on the site of a Roman marching camp. It holds an annual "Rushbearing Festival" each year in late June. Warcop boasts the oldest usable bridge over the river Eden, which dates from the 14th century or earlier.

The village has houses that date from at least the 15th century  - Warcop Tower c. 1400 or before and Warcop Hall c. 1500, other houses date from the 17th or 18th century to the present day. It was historically part of Westmorland until 1974.

Warcop had its own railway station, Warcop railway station from 1862, which closed in 1962. The station yard (the station house is a private residence) has now reopened as part of the Eden Valley Railway.

The Ministry of Defence operates the Warcop Training Area in the country and fell to the North West of Warcop, providing tank and infantry training.

Governance
An electoral ward in the same name exists. This ward stretches north to Murton with a total population taken at the 2011 Census of 1,352.

See also

Listed buildings in Warcop

References

Location grid

External links
 
 Cumbria County History Trust: Warcop (nb: provisional research only – see Talk page)

 
Villages in Cumbria
Civil parishes in Cumbria
Eden District